Carlos García-Bedoya Zapata (November 7, 1925 in Lima – October 2, 1980 in Lima) was a Peruvian diplomat.

He was Peruvian Ambassador in the United States from 1976 until 1979 and the foreign minister of Peru in 1979.

Works 
 “Política Exterior Peruana. Teoría y Práctica”

See also
 Andean Community

External links
 XXV Aniversario del deceso del Embajador Carlos García
 Veinte años de ausencia del Embajador Carlos García Bedoya

1980 deaths
1925 births
People from Lima
Foreign ministers of Peru
Ambassadors of Peru to the United States